This article catalogs the historic properties in the mining town of Goldfield, Arizona. The town was originally known as Goldfield, later renamed to Youngberg and again named Goldfield by the current owners. The list below highlights a photographic gallery of some of the town's historic structures—all of which were either restored or rebuilt. The town was founded in 1893, after the discovery of gold in the surrounding area of the Superstition Mountains. The town was abandoned twice by its residents after the mine veins faulted. The land where the town is located was purchased by a private investor and is now a tourist attraction. Goldfield's Superstition Narrow Gauge Railroad is the only  narrow-gauge railroad in operation in Arizona. Other attractions include re-enactments of gunfights on the Main Street of the town.

Brief history
Collin Hakes, Riley Morse, and Orlando and Orin Merrill were the first to discover gold in the Goldfield area of the Superstition Mountains. Soon thereafter, prospectors came to the area in search of gold. In 1893, the mining town, which became known as Goldfield, was founded next to the Superstition Mountain in what was then the Arizona Territory. The town, in its heyday, reached a population of about 4000 residents. It had a hotel, general store, post office, church and school. The Goldfield Post Office was established on October 7, 1893.  When the mine vein faulted in 1897, the grade of ore dropped leaving the miners without a job. The town began to suffer since its economy depended heavily on the earnings of the miners, who moved out. It was not long before the rest of the towns residents relocated, as well, to other areas rendering Goldfield a ghost town. The Goldfield Post Office was discontinued on November 2, 1898.

In 1910, several mines were opened nearby with the installation of a mill and cyanide plant. A small community called Youngberg evolved around the ghost town. The town was named after George U. Young, secretary of Arizona and acting governor at the time, who was also the promoter and general manager for the Derby Mining Company from 1900–1908. Young was interested in promoting the development of the mining industry of the area. He became vice president and general manager of the Madizelle Mining Company in Prescott, Arizona and Young Mines Company, Ltd. in Goldfield. However, after years of investments from investors on the east coast, the mines faulted again and by around 1918, Young had suffered an accident at Youngberg. The accident ultimately led to Young's sudden death at his home at 'Derby Mines' on Thanksgiving day in 1926, after which the town of Youngberg and the Madizelle in Yavapai County were once again deserted.

Robert F. "Bob” Schoose was born in River Grove, Illinois and moved to California with his family at a young age. He heard of the old site of Goldfield and moved to the town Mesa, Arizona. In 1984, Schoose and his wife Lou Ann, purchased the Goldfield Mill property and decided to rebuild and restore the buildings of the old town with the help of various friends—whose names are inscribed in a plaque on the tower that leads to the town. Schoose incorporated the town as the "GOLDFIELD, GHOST TOWN AND MINE TOURS, INC." He serves as President, his wife as Secretary/Treasurer, and Jay Zingler as Vice-President.

The town and its historic buildings were revived as a tourist attraction. The town has the only  narrow gauge railroad in operation in Arizona. It also has numerous shops and buildings, including a brothel, bakery, leather works, a jail, livery, and others. Also, pictured is an 1890 Porter 0-4-0 narrow gauge steam engine which once was used in the gold mines of Goldfield. The Main Street of the town features a reenactment of a western shootout (a photo is also included in the  picture gallery). The town is located at 4650 N, Mammoth Mine Road within the jurisdiction of Apache Junction, Arizona.

Historic structures pictures
Among the historic structures and artifacts pictured are the following:

 The 19th-century "Tower" used in the Goldfield mine.
 The 19th-century Goldfield Railroad Station.
 The only 3 ft (914 mm) narrow-gauge railroad in operation in Arizona.
 A 1890 Porter 0-4-0 once used in the gold mines of Goldfield.
 The Bordello (Brothel).
 The Barn/Stable.
 An abandoned Spanish style house.
 The Livery.
 The Goldfield Museum.
 The Post Office.
 The 19th-century Mercantile building.
 The Mammoth Steak House and Saloon.
 The Goldfield Church at the Mount.
 The Church at the Mount Sunday School, Nursery and Fellowship Hall.
 The Water Tank.
 The Cantina/Bakery.

Historic structures
The following photographs are of some of the historic structures in Goldfield.

Goldfield Gunfighters reenactment
The following photographs are of a gunfight reenactment by the Goldfield Gunfighters in Youngfield.

Further reading
 Hiking Arizona's Superstition and Mazatzal Country: A Guide to the Areas Greatest Hikes (Regional Hiking Series); by: Bruce Grubbs; Publisher: Falcon Guides; .
 Southwest Treasure Hunter's Gem & Mineral Guide, 5th Edition: Where & How to Dig, Pan and Mine Your Own Gems & Minerals; by: Kathy J. Rygle and Stephen F. Pedersen; Publisher: GemStone Press; 5 edition; .

See also

 Old Tucson Studios
 Pioneer Living History Museum

References

External links
 Goldfield Ghost Town

Buildings and structures in Pinal County, Arizona
Historic sites in Arizona
History of Pinal County, Arizona
Goldfield
Ghost towns in Arizona
Cemeteries in Arizona